Lubero is a town in the North Kivu Province of the Democratic Republic of the Congo. It is the administrative center of the Lubero Territory. Following the surrender of the Mai-Mai fighters in 2021, construction of a new market began in 2022, involving the mayor, ex-soldiers, "young people at risk and the vulnerable women". , the population of Lubero is not publicly known.

Location 

Overview 
Lubero is a medium-sized town with several modern amenities including an airport, Lubero Airport, with a grass runway. In the hills around the town, a mini-hydropower station, Lubero Hydroelectric Power Station, is planned to complement Mutwanga Hydroelectric Power Station and Rutshuru Hydroelectric Power Station, in supplying power to the communities in and around Virunga National Park.

Like most localities in North Kivu, Lubero has witnessed plenty of violence as the various militias have battled each other for real estate and treasure during the last two decades. Battles have also been fought between the militias, government forces and United Nations "peace keepers". The toll in human lives has been high. Many have been left with physical disabilities. More suffer long-term psychological war trauma.

In 2022 MONUSCO announced that work had begun to build a market here involving ex-combatants as part of their integration into the community. The market was designed to offer protection to vulnerable women.

Gallery

See also
 United Nations Force Intervention Brigade
 MONUC
 March 23 Movement
 National Congress for the Defence of the People
 Rally for Congolese Democracy
 Rally for Congolese Democracy–Goma
 Democratic Forces for the Liberation of Rwanda
 Mai Mai
 Rutshuru
 Masisi
 Western Rift Valley

References

Populated places in North Kivu